Kazi Shahidun Nabi was a Bangladeshi lawyer who served as the 9th Attorney General of Bangladesh from 1996 until 1998. He died on July 8, 2018 in his Dhanmondi Residence in Dhaka.

Career
Nabi was called to the bar at Lincoln's Inn, London in 1961. He served as a faculty member of Central Law College in Dhaka. He was enrolled to Bangladesh Supreme Court in 1986.

In the Seventh National Parliamentary Elections in 1996, Nabi was a candidate of Bangladesh Awami League from the Munshiganj-1 constituency and lost to A. Q. M. Badruddoza Chowdhury. He served as the chairmen of the Bangladesh Bar Council during 1996–1998.

In 1999, Nabi served as the lawyer of Bangladeshi businessman Aziz Mohammad Bhai after he was arrested by the Special Branch of police in the allegation of being involved in film actor Sohel Chowdhury murder, using women in smuggling and supply of secret government information and documents abroad.

Personal life
Nabi is the son of one of the cousins of Humayun Rashid Choudhury, former speaker of the Bangladesh National Parliament.

References

Living people
1940s births
20th-century Bangladeshi lawyers
Attorneys General of Bangladesh
Awami League politicians
Place of birth missing (living people)
Date of birth missing (living people)